Diario Wochenblatt is a German-language newspaper published in Asunción, Paraguay.

References

Year of establishment missing
Newspapers published in Paraguay
German-language newspapers published in South America
Culture in Asunción